A cabinet crisis, government crisis or political crisis refers to a situation where an incumbent government is unable to form or function, is toppled through an uprising, or collapses. Political crises may correspond with, cause or be caused by economic crises, and may spread between neighbouring countries.

Examples of cabinet crises

Belgium 
2007–2011 Belgian political crisis
2010–2011 Belgian government formation
2019–2020 Belgian government formation

Czech Republic 

 1997–1998 Czech political crisis

France 

 May 1958 crisis in France

Germany 

 2018 German government crisis

Iceland 
Cabinet of Björn Þórðarson (1942–44 caretaker government)
Klaustur Affair

Iraq 

 2022 Iraqi political crisis

Italy 
2008 Italian government crisis
2019 Italian government crisis
2021 Italian government crisis
2022 Italian government crisis

Netherlands 
Dutch childcare benefits scandal

Malawi 

 1964 Malawi cabinet crisis

Malaysia 

 2020–2022 Malaysian political crisis

Maldives 

 2011–2013 Maldives political crisis
 2018 Maldives political crisis

Spain 
2015–2016 Spanish government formation

Sri Lanka 
2022 Sri Lankan political crisis

Sweden 
1936 Swedish government crisis
1978 Swedish government crisis
1981 Swedish government crisis
2018–2019 Swedish government formation
2021 Swedish government crisis

Thailand 

 2005–2006 Thai political crisis
 2008 Thai political crisis

Tunisia 
2013–2014 Tunisian political crisis
 Mechichi Cabinet
 2021 Tunisian political crisis

United Kingdom 
War cabinet crisis, May 1940
Westland affair
2018 British cabinet reshuffle
July 2022 United Kingdom government crisis
October 2022 United Kingdom government crisis

See also

 Budget crisis
 Constitutional crisis
 Government shutdown
 Gridlock (politics)

References

Crisis
Government
Political crisis